The Altai Mountains, also spelled Altay Mountains, are a mountain range in Central and East Asia, where Russia, China, Mongolia and Kazakhstan converge, and where the rivers Irtysh and Ob have their headwaters. The massif merges with the Sayan Mountains in the northeast, and gradually becomes lower in the southeast, where it merges into the high plateau of the Gobi Desert. It spans from about 45° to 52° N and from about 84° to 99° E.

The region is inhabited by a sparse but ethnically diverse population, including Russians, Kazakhs, Altais, Mongols and Volga Germans, though predominantly represented by indigenous ethnic minorities of semi-nomadic stock. The local economy is based on bovine, sheep, horse husbandry, hunting, agriculture, forestry, and mining. The Altaic language family takes its name from this mountain range.

Etymology and modern names 
Altai is derived from underlying form *altañ "gold, golden" (compare Old Turkic 𐰞𐱃𐰆𐰣 altun "gold, golden") with coda -ñ underlying the -n & -y correspondence among cognates in different Turkic languages & dialects (e.g. qōñ ~ qoy "sheep", Qitan ~ Qitay "Khitans", etc.), as well as in Mongolian.

The mountains are called Altain nuruu in Khalkha Mongolian, altai-yin niruɣu in Chakhar Mongolian, and Altay tuular in the Altay language.

Geography
The Altai Mountains are a system of remote mountains in central Asia that cover an area .

In the north of the region is the Sailughem Mountains, also known as Kolyvan Altai, which stretch northeast from 49° N and 86° E towards the western extremity of the Sayan Mountains in 51° 60' N and 89° E. Their mean elevation is 1,500 to 1,750 m. The snow-line runs at 2,000 m on the northern side and at 2,400 m on the southern, and above it the rugged peaks tower some 1,000 m higher. Mountain passes across the range are few and difficult, the chief being the Ulan-daban at 2,827 m (2,879 m according to Kozlov), and the Chapchan-daban, at 3,217 m, in the south and north respectively. On the east and southeast this range is flanked by the great plateau of Mongolia, the transition being affected gradually by means of several minor plateaus, such as Ukok (2,380 m) with Pazyryk Valley, Chuya (1,830 m), Kendykty (2,500 m), Kak (2,520 m), (2,590 m), and (2,410 m).

This region is studded with large lakes, e.g. Uvs 720 m above sea level, Khyargas, Dorgon and Khar 1,170 m, and traversed by various mountain ranges, of which the principal are the Tannu-Ola Mountains, running roughly parallel with the Sayan Mountains as far east as the Kosso-gol, and the Khan Khökhii mountains, also stretching west and east.

The north western and northern slopes of the Sailughem Mountains are extremely steep and difficult to access. On this side lies the highest summit of the range, the double-headed Belukha, whose summits reach 4,506 and 4,440 m respectively, and give origin to several glaciers (30 square kilometers in aggregate area). Altaians call it Kadyn Bazhy, but is also called Uch-Sumer.
The second highest peak of the range is in Mongolian part named Khüiten Peak. This massive peak reaches 4374 m. Numerous spurs, striking in all directions from the Sailughem mountains, fill up the space between that range and the lowlands of Tomsk. Such are the Chuya Belki, having an average elevation of 2,700 m, with summits from 3,500 to 4,177 m, and several glaciers on their northern slope; the Katun Belki, which have a mean elevation of about 3,000 m and are mostly snow-clad; the Kholzun range; the Korgon, highest point Mayak Shangina, the Talitsk and Selitsk ranges; as well as the Tigeretsk Range.

Several secondary plateaus of lower elevations are also distinguished by geographers. The Katun Valley begins as a wild gorge on the south-west slope of Belukha; then, after a big bend, the river (600 km long) pierces the Katun Belki, and enters a wider valley, lying at an elevation of 600 to 1,100 m, which it follows until it emerges from the Altai highlands to join the Biya in a most picturesque region. The Katun and the Biya together form the Ob.

The next valley is that of the Charysh, which has the Korgon and Tigeretsk Range on one side and the Talitsk and Baschelaksk Range (Бащелакский хребет) on the other. This, too, is very fertile. The Altai, seen from this valley, presents the most romantic scenes, including the small but deep Kolyvan Lake (altitude 360 m), which is surrounded by fantastic granite domes and towers.

Farther west the valleys of the Uba, the Ulba and the Bukhtarma open south-westwards towards the Irtysh. The lower part of the first, like the lower valley of the Charysh, is thickly populated; in the valley of the Ulba is the Riddersk mine, at the foot of the Ivanovsk Peak (2,060 m), clothed with alpine meadows. The valley of the Bukhtarma, which has a length of 320 km, also has its origin at the foot of the Belukha and the Kuitun peaks, and as it falls some 1,500 m in about 300 km, from an alpine plateau at an elevation of 1,900 m to the Bukhtarma fortress (345 m), it offers the most striking contrasts of landscape and vegetation. Its upper parts abound in glaciers, the best known of which is the Berel, which descends from the Belukha. On the northern side of the range which separates the upper Bukhtarma from the upper Katun is the Katun glacier, which after two ice-falls widens out to 700 to 900 metres. From a grotto in this glacier bursts tumultuously the Katun river.

The middle and lower parts of the Bukhtarma valley have been colonized since the 18th century by runaway Russian peasants, serfs, and religious schismatics (Raskolniks), who created a free republic there on Chinese territory; and after this part of the valley was annexed to Russia in 1869, it was rapidly colonized. The high valleys farther north, on the same western face of the Sailughem range, are but little known, their only visitors being Kyrgyz shepherds.

Those of Bashkaus, Chulyshman, and Chulcha, all three leading to the alpine lake of Teletskoye (length, 80 km; maximum width, 5 km; elevation, 520 m; area, 230.8 square kilometers; maximum depth, 310 m; mean depth, 200 m), are inhabited by Telengit people. The shores of the lake rise almost sheer to over 1,800 m. From this lake issues the Biya, which joins the Katun at Biysk, and then meanders through the prairies of the north-west of the Altai.

Farther north the Altai highlands are continued in the Kuznetsk district, which has a slightly different geological aspect, but belongs to the Altai system. But the Abakan River, which rises on the western shoulder of the Sayan mountains, belongs to the system of the Yenisei. The Kuznetsk Ala-tau range, on the left bank of the Abakan, runs north-east into the government of Yeniseisk, while a complexus of mountains (Chukchut, Salair, Abakan) fills up the country northwards towards the Trans-Siberian Railway and westwards towards the Ob.

The Ek-tagh or Mongolian Altai, which separates the Khovd basin on the north from the Irtysh basin on the south, is a true border-range, in that it rises in a steep and lofty escarpment from the Dzungarian depression (470–900 m), but descends on the north by a relatively short slope to the plateau (1,150 to 1,680 m) of north-western Mongolia. East of 94° E the range is continued by a double series of mountain chains, all of which exhibit less sharply marked orographical features and are at considerably lower elevations. The slopes of the constituent chains of the system are inhabited principally by nomadic Kyrgyz.

The five highest mountains of the Altai are:
 Belukha, Russia
 Khüiten Peak, Mongolia
 Mönkh Khairkhan, Mongolia
 Sutai Mountain, Mongolia
 Tsambagarav, Mongolia

Fauna 

 
The Altai-Sayan ecoregion is located at the intersection of the Central Asian and Siberian faunal provinces.

The Altai mountains are home to a diverse fauna, because of its different habitats, like steppes, northern taigas and alpine vegetation. Steep slopes are home to the Siberian ibex (Capra sibirica), whereas the rare argali (Ovis ammon) is found on more gentle slopes. Deer are represented by five species: Altai wapiti (Cervus elaphus sibiricus), moose (Alces alces), forest reindeer (Rangifer tarandus valentinae), Siberian musk deer (Moschus moschiferus), and Siberian roe deer (Capreolus pygargus). Moose and reindeer however, are restricted to the northern parts of the mountain range. The wild boar (Sus scrofa) is found in the lower foothills and surrounding lowlands.  Until recently, the Mongolian gazelle (Procapra gutturosa) was found in the Russian Altai mountains, more specifically in the Chuya River steppe close to the Mongolian border. Large predators are represented by snow leopards (Panthera uncia, syn. Uncia uncia), wolves (Canis lupus), lynx (Lynx lynx), and brown bears (Ursus arctos), in the northern parts also by the wolverine (Gulo gulo). The Tien Shan dhole (Cuon alpinus hesperius) (a northwestern subspecies of the Asiatic wild dog) also lives there. Most species of the region are of Mongolian origin.

Until the 20th century, the Caspian tiger (Panthera tigris virgata) was found in the southern parts of the Altai mountains, where it reached Lake Zaisan and the Black Irtysh. Single individuals were also shot further north, for example close to Barnaul. Closely related to the Caspian tiger is the extant Amur tiger, which has the taxonomic name Panthera tigris altaica.

The wisent was present in the Altai mountains until the Middle Ages, perhaps even until the 18th century. Today, there is a small herd in a nursery in the Altai Republic.

Moor frogs are near bodies of water as high up as 2000 m (1.24 mi) in the Altai mountains.

History
The Altai mountains have retained a remarkably stable climate changing little since the last ice age. In addition the mix of mammals has remained largely the same, with a few exceptions such as extinct mammoths, making it one of the few places on earth to retain an ice age fauna.

The Altai mountains were home to the Denisovan branch of hominids who were contemporaries of Neanderthals and of Homo sapiens (modern humans), descended from Hominids who reached Asia earlier than modern humans. The Denisova hominin, dated to 40,000 years ago, was discovered in the Denisova Cave of the Altai mountains in southern Siberia in 2008. Knowledge of the Denisovan humans derives primarily from DNA evidence and artifacts, as no complete skeletons have yet been recovered. DNA evidence has been unusually well preserved because of the low average temperature in the Denisova caves. Neanderthal bones and tools made by Homo sapiens have also been found in the Denisova Cave, making it the only place in the world where all three hominids are known to have lived.

A dog-like canid from 33,000 years ago was found in the Razboinichya Cave. DNA analysis published in 2013 affirmed that it was more closely related to modern dogs than to wolves.

The Altai Mountains have been identified as being the point of origin of a cultural enigma termed the Seima-Turbino Phenomenon which arose during the Bronze Age around the start of the 2nd millennium BC and led to a rapid and massive migration of peoples from the region into distant parts of Europe and Asia.

Some historians believe that the Altai mountain region may have been the location where skiing was born, however this remains disputed. Evidence to support the claims includes several cave petroglyphs within the Altai Mountains in modern China that depicts human figures on skis that are chasing after an ibex. According to a study published by the Australian Rock Art Research Association (AURA) in 2016, this rock art was estimated to be between 4,000 and 5,250 years ago, which consequently meant it may be just as old or possibly older than ancient skiing rock art and artefacts located in Scandinavia. However, dating petroglyphs accurately with current technology, is very difficult. The oldest known texts that describes skiing, is from a Chinese text that dates to the Western Han Dynasty (206 BC to 24 AD) and refers to skiers in the Altai Mountains.

World Heritage site

A vast area of 16,178 km2—Altai and Katun Natural Reserves, Lake Teletskoye, Mount Belukha, and the Ukok Plateau—comprises a natural UNESCO World Heritage Site entitled Golden Mountains of Altai. As stated in the UNESCO description of the site, "the region represents the most complete sequence of altitudinal vegetation zones in central Siberia, from steppe, forest-steppe, mixed forest, subalpine vegetation to alpine vegetation". While making its decision, UNESCO also cited Russian Altai's importance for preservation of the globally endangered mammals, such as snow leopard and the Altai argali. Siberian ibex also live in these mountains. The Uvs Nuur basin is also a protected site.

Violations of the protection status of Argali sheep and other species have been alleged, together with accusations of corruption, in the Altaigate Scandal. The incident arose from the death of several Russian VIPs in a helicopter crash early in 2009, purportedly on a poaching excursion.

Geology
The Siberian Altai represents the northernmost region affected by the tectonic collision of India into Asia. Massive fault systems run through the area, including the Kurai fault zone and the recently identified Tashanta fault zone. These fault systems are typically thrusts or right lateral strike-slip faults, some of which are tectonically active. Rock types in the mountains are typically granites and metamorphic schists, and some are highly sheared near to fault zones.

Geologist Victor R. Baker "has discovered past cataclysmic floods in the Altai Mountains of Siberia" from "an even larger glacial lake" than Lake Missoula, which was once thought to have been "the largest ice-dammed lake in the world."

Seismic activity
Although earthquakes are generally rare occurrences, on 27 September 2003 a very large earthquake measuring MW 7.3 occurred in the Chuya Basin area to the south of the Altai region. This earthquake and its aftershocks devastated much of the region, causing $10.6 million in damage (USGS) and wiping out the village of Beltir.

See also

 Altai Republic
 Altai Krai
 Altay Prefecture
 Govi-Altai Province
 Altaic languages
 Altay language
 Altai-Sayan region
 List of Altai mountains

References

Sources
 
Authorities cited:
 P. Semenov and G. N. Potanin, in supplementary vol. of Russian ed. of Ritter's Asien (1877)
 Ledebour, Reise durch das Altaigebirge (1829–1830)
 P. Chikhatchev, Voyage scientifique dans l'Altai oriental (1845)
 Gebler, Übersicht des katunischen Gebirges (1837)
 G. von Helmersen, Reise nach dem Altai (St Petersburg, 1848)
 T. W. Atkinson, Oriental and Western Siberia (1858)
 Cotta, Der Altai (1871)
 Adrianov, "Journey to the Altai," in Zapiski Russ. Geogr. Soc. xi.
 Yadrintsev, "Journey in West Siberia," in Zapiski West Sib. Geogr. Soc. ii.
 Golubev, Altai (1890, Russian)
 Schmurlo, "Passes in S. Altai" (Sailughem), in Izvestia Russ. Geogr. Soc. (1898); xxxiv. 5
 V. Saposhnikov, various articles in same periodical (1897), xxxiii. and (1899) xxxv., and, by the same, Katun i yeya Istoki (Tomsk, 1901)
 S. Turner, Siberia (1905)
 Deniker, on Kozlov's explorations, in La Géographie (1901, pp. 41, &c.)
 P. Ignatov, in Izvestia Russ. Geog. Soc. (1902, No. 2).

External links

 Golden Mountains of Altai at Natural Heritage Protection Fund
 UNESCO's evaluation of Altai (PDF file)

 
Mountain ranges of China
Mountain ranges of Kazakhstan
Mountain ranges of Mongolia
Mountain ranges of Russia
Mountain ranges of Xinjiang
Physiographic provinces
World Heritage Sites in Russia